Buckhurst Hill Football Club is a football club based in Buckhurst Hill, England.

History
Buckhurst Hill were formed in 1985 by Richard Brand and Alfie Sacre in a bid to provide Buckhurst Hill with youth football. In 2004, Buckhurst Hill joined the Hertfordshire Senior County League. In 2008, the club joined the Essex Olympian League. In 2017, the club won Division One, gaining promotion to the Premier Division, which they also won in 2018. In 2021, the club was admitted into the Eastern Counties League Division One South. In their first season at step 6, they finished as runners-up, losing only two league matches in the season. At the end of the season Buckhurst Hill were allocated a place in the Essex senior league. Buckhurst Hill entered the FA Vase for the first time in 2021–22. In 2022/23 season, Buckhurst Hill entered the FA Cup first the first time.

Ground
The club currently play at Myrak Park, Roding Lane in Buckhurst Hill. In 2020, the club won permission from Epping Forest District Council to erect a 100-seater stand, a 100-capacity standing area and six floodlights. A new standing area for 100 people was erected at the beginning of the 2022/23 season.

References

Association football clubs established in 1985
1985 establishments in England
Football clubs in England
Football clubs in Essex
Hertfordshire Senior County League
Essex Olympian Football League
Eastern Counties Football League